The Jefferson Davis Monument State Historic Site is a Kentucky state park commemorating the birthplace of Jefferson Davis, the president of the Confederate States of America, in Fairview, Kentucky. The site's focal point is a  concrete obelisk. In 1973, it was believed to be the fourth-tallest monument in the United States and the tallest concrete-cast one.

History of the monument

Simon Bolivar Buckner, Sr., a Confederate general, first proposed the idea of a monument for Davis during a reunion of the Orphan Brigade of the Confederate Army in 1907. Construction began in 1917 but stopped in 1918 at a height of  due to building material rationing during World War I.  Construction resumed in January 1922 and was finished in 1924 at a cost of $200,000. The monument's base was set on limestone bedrock and limestone was quarried on the site for use in its construction. The monument was listed in the National Register of Historic Places in 1973. The obelisk was closed to the public from 1999 until May 2004 for renovations and construction of a new visitor center. At the top of the monument is an observation room with a window in each of the four walls. Originally, this room could only be reached by climbing stairs which went around the interior of the monument; an elevator, installed in 1929, now takes visitors to and from the observation room.

Park details

The Jefferson Davis State Historic Site is one of eleven historic sites in Kentucky which include small parks and are maintained by the Kentucky Department of Parks.

At the visitors' center museum, visitors can watch a video describing Davis' life and the construction of the monument.  Guided elevator tours of the monument are available daily.

The center sells books and memorabilia about Davis, the American Civil War, and the surrounding area, as well as Kentucky handcrafts.  The park is open from May 1 until October 31.

Monument size

The monument is the tallest unreinforced concrete structure in the world. No steel was used to reinforce the concrete walls below its pyramidal top. As one pour was completed, large chunks of limestone were left projecting up to connect it to the next pour above. It is also the tallest concrete obelisk in the world.

Elsewhere in the world, the Great Pyramid of Giza, Khafre's Pyramid, Spring Temple Buddha, and Ushiku Daibutsu are taller monuments.

Gallery

See also
 List of memorials to Jefferson Davis
 List of tallest towers in the world

References

External links
 
 Roadside America review of site
 Civil War Album description and pictures
 
 Entry at Skyscraperpage.com

Davis, Jefferson
Confederate States of America monuments and memorials in Kentucky
State Historic Site
Kentucky State Historic Sites
State parks of Kentucky
Monuments and memorials on the National Register of Historic Places in Kentucky
Museums in Todd County, Kentucky
National Register of Historic Places in Todd County, Kentucky
Obelisks in the United States
Protected areas of Todd County, Kentucky
1917 sculptures
Davis, Jefferson
1917 establishments in Kentucky